is a mountain and it stretches Ibaraki Prefecture with Fukushima in Japan. Mount Yamizo is the highest mountain in Ibaraki Prefecture.

Access 
The mountain is close to below-mentioned bus stop. The walk brings to the gate of a mountain from the bus stop at 2 hours.
Ibaraki Kotsu - Jaketsu bus stop
For Hitachi-Daigo Station via Shimonomiya Station.

Surrounding area 
Nichirinji Temple

See also 
 List of mountains in Japan

References

Mountains of Ibaraki Prefecture